was a Japanese swimmer who competed at the 1932 Summer Olympics.

Kawatsu was a native of Hiroshima City, where his father was a physical education instructor at the predecessor of Hiroshima University. In 1930, while still in middle school, Kawatsu set a new Japan record of 33.2 seconds for the 50-meter backstroke. In 1932, while a student at Meiji University, he was selected for the Japanese Olympic team to the Los Angeles Olympics. The team took the gold, silver and bronze medals in the 100 meter backstroke event, with Kawatsu winning the bronze medal.

He subsequently participated in the 1934 Far Eastern Games held in Manila.

Kawatsu committed suicide by burning himself to death on March 23, 1970.

References

Further reading 

 Lohn, John. Historical Dictionary of Competitive Swimming. Scarecrow Press, (2010). 
 Profile

1914 births
1970 suicides
Sportspeople from Hiroshima
Meiji University alumni
Olympic swimmers of Japan
Swimmers at the 1932 Summer Olympics
Olympic bronze medalists for Japan
Suicides in Japan
Suicides by self-immolation
Olympic bronze medalists in swimming
Medalists at the 1932 Summer Olympics
Japanese male backstroke swimmers
20th-century Japanese people